The 2020 Texas State Bobcats football team represented Texas State University in the 2020 NCAA Division I FBS football season. The Bobcats played their home games at Bobcat Stadium in San Marcos, Texas, and competed in the West Division of the Sun Belt Conference. They were led by second-year head coach Jake Spavital.

Preseason

Recruiting class
References:

|}

Sun Belt media poll
The Sun Belt coaches poll will be released in July 2020.

Sun Belt Preseason All-Conference teams
Sources: 

Offense

2nd team
Aaron Brewer – SR, Offensive Line

Defense

1st team
Bryan London II – SR, Linebacker

2nd team
Nikolas Daniels – SR, Linebacker

Award watch lists
Listed in the order that they were released

Sources:

Roster

Schedule
The 2020 Texas State schedule consists of 7 home and 5 away games in the regular season. The Bobcats will play host to conference foes Louisiana, Appalachian State, Arkansas State, and Coastal Carolina. They will travel to conference opponents Troy, South Alabama, and Georgia Southern

Texas State had games scheduled against Ohio and New Mexico State, which were canceled due to the COVID-19 pandemic.

Schedule Source:

Game summaries

SMU

UTSA

at Louisiana–Monroe

at Boston College

at Troy

at South Alabama

at BYU

Louisiana

Appalachian State

at Georgia Southern

Arkansas State

Coastal Carolina

References

Texas State
Texas State Bobcats football seasons
Texas State Bobcats football